Ziad Makkawi is an entrepreneur & investor, a French national born in New York City on December 25, 1961, to Lebanese  parents.

Career
Makkawi is a serial Financial Services entrepreneur. Makkawi is the Founder & CEO of EQUIAM a San Francisco based manager disrupting the traditional VC investment model by applying a highly differentiated systematic, data driven investment strategy. Prior to EQUIAM, Makkawi pioneered in Emerging Markets the investment banking, asset management and private equity activities. He has served as Chief Investment Officer; Chief Executive Officer; Board Member and Chairman at numerous organizations globally. 

Makkawi began his career with JP Morgan on Wall Street in 1986. He later joined Elf Aquitaine in Geneva before moving to the Middle East to co-found Lebanon Invest later sold to Bank Audi, and then Middle East Capital Group as Managing Director responsible for Capital Markets.
In 2000, Makkawi moved to Dubai to build and run Shuaa Capital’s financial Services business including asset management, proprietary trading, capital markets, research and brokerage activities. In 2004 he was appointed CEO of Dubai Bank and in 2006 he founded and ran as Chairman and CEO Algebra Capital a MENA focused Asset Management firm he later sold to Global Asset Manager Franklin Templeton in 2010.  Makkawi has been a pioneer in the development of both the investment banking and asset management industries in the region. In 2013 he was appointed CEO of Istithmar World the PE investment arm of Dubai World, a multi-billion global portfolio across multiple sectors including hospitality, financial services, retail, logistics, wellness, and real estate.

Makkawi currently sits on the Advisory Board of Crypto1 a Nasdaq listed $230MM SPAC, and is an Advisor/Investment Committee member on the Dubai Future District Fund, an AED 1 Billion Fund targeting the growth of fintech and the future economy. Makkawi previously served as director on numerous boards including MECG (Beirut); National Bonds (UAE); Amwal (Qatar); Franklin Templeton International ME (UAE); Jadara Capital (UAE); International Hotel Resorts (Malta); Gulf Africa Bank (Kenya); Blue Gate Capital Partners (BVI); Pension Insurance Corporation (UK); Istithmar P&O Estates (UK); Art Sawa (UAE); Algebra Capital (UAE); Capital Management House (Bahrain); Tigris Enterprises (Iraq). He also oversaw Istithmar’s investments on the boards of Barneys (NYC); Cirque du Soleil (Canada),  as well as dozens of funds.

Education, awards and distinctions
Makkawi has been a frequent speaker at events and conferences. He served on and acted as Chairman of the Young President Organization's Emirates Chapter and Chaired the YPO Global Art Network Committee.

Makkawi holds a Masters in International Affairs from Columbia University in NY; An MBA in Finance from New York University’s Stern School; and a BA in Economics from Rice University in Houston.

Makkawi has promoted and invested in young entrepreneurs in the digital space in the MENA region.

Makkawi has been a promoter and collector of Arab Contemporary Art and sponsored Art Sawa one of the region’s leading art galleries promoting Emerging and established talent from the Middle East.

Personal life
His childhood was spent in New York City, Washington, D.C., Beirut, Berlin, and London. Makkawi is married with three children. He speaks five languages.

References

1961 births
Businesspeople from New York City
Living people
School of International and Public Affairs, Columbia University alumni
American investors
Islamic banking
Rice University alumni
American chief executives
New York University Stern School of Business alumni